Stefan Watermeyer (born 3 June 1988) is a former South African rugby union player that regularly played as a centre. He also represented South Africa at schoolboy, Under-19 and Under-20 level and also played for a South Africa President's XV at the 2013 IRB Tbilisi Cup.

He announced his retirement from rugby at the conclusion of the 2016 Super Rugby season with the Southern Kings.

Career

On his Ospreys debut, he scored a try and was named Man of the Match. However, the implementation of a wage cap in Wales meant that he was released by the Ospreys in July 2012.

He was a member of the Pumas side that won the Vodacom Cup for the first time in 2015, beating  24–7 in the final. Watermeyer made nine appearances during the season, scoring one try.

He joined the  prior to the 2016 Super Rugby season.

Representative rugby

In 2013, he was included in a South Africa President's XV team that played in the 2013 IRB Tbilisi Cup and won the tournament after winning all three matches.

References

External links
 
 itsrugby.co.uk profile

Living people
1988 births
South African rugby union players
Bulls (rugby union) players
Blue Bulls players
Rugby union centres
Afrikaner people
People from Mbombela
Griquas (rugby union) players
Pumas (Currie Cup) players
Ospreys (rugby union) players
Lions (United Rugby Championship) players
Expatriate rugby union players in Wales
South African expatriate sportspeople in Wales
South Africa Under-20 international rugby union players
Southern Kings players
Rugby union players from Mpumalanga